The 2010 Gastein Ladies (also known as NÜRNBERGER Gastein Ladies for sponsorship purposes) was a women's tennis tournament played on outdoor clay courts. It was the 4th edition of the Gastein Ladies, and was part of the WTA International tournaments of the 2010 WTA Tour. It was being held in Bad Gastein, Austria, from 19 July intil 25 July 2010. Julia Görges won the singles title.

WTA entrants

Seeds

Seedings are based on the rankings of July 12, 2010.

Other entrants
The following players received wildcards into the singles main draw:
  Nikola Hofmanova
  Melanie Klaffner
  Patricia Mayr

The following players received entry from the qualifying draw:
  Ekaterina Dzehalevich
  Laura Pous Tió
  Lesya Tsurenko
  Lenka Tvarošková

Finals

Singles

 Julia Görges defeated  Timea Bacsinszky, 6–1, 6–4
 It was Görges' first singles title of her career.

Doubles

 Lucie Hradecká /  Anabel Medina Garrigues defeated  Timea Bacsinszky /  Tathiana Garbin, 6–7(2), 6–1, [10–5]

External links
Official website

Gastein Ladies
Gastein Ladies
2010 in Austrian women's sport
Gastein Ladies
2010 in Austrian tennis